The Minnesota North Stars were a professional ice hockey team in the National Hockey League (NHL) for 26 seasons, from 1967 to 1993. The North Stars played their home games at the Met Center in Bloomington, Minnesota, and the team's colors for most of its history were green, yellow, gold and white. The North Stars played 2,062 regular season games and made the NHL playoffs 17 times, including two Stanley Cup Finals appearances, but were unable to win the Stanley Cup. After the 1992–93 season, the franchise moved to Dallas, and the team was renamed the Dallas Stars.

History

Beginnings

On March 11, 1965, NHL President Clarence Campbell announced that the league would expand to twelve teams from six through the creation of a new six-team division for the 1967–68 season. In response to Campbell's announcement, a partnership of nine men, led by Walter Bush, Jr., Robert Ridder, and John Driscoll, was formed to seek a franchise for the Twin Cities area of Minnesota. Their efforts were successful, as the NHL awarded one of its six expansion franchises to Minnesota on February 9, 1966. In addition to Minnesota, the five other franchises were awarded to Oakland, Los Angeles, Philadelphia, Pittsburgh, and St. Louis. The expansion fee for all six new clubs was $2 million for each team ($ in  dollars). The "North Stars" name was announced on May 25, 1966, following a public contest. The name is derived from the state's motto "L'Étoile du Nord", which is a French phrase meaning "The Star of the North". Months after the naming of the team, ground was broken on October 3, 1966, for a new hockey arena in Bloomington, Minnesota. The home of the North Stars, the Metropolitan Sports Center, was built in 12 months at a cost of US$7 million ($ in  dollars). The arena was ready for play for the start of the 1967–68 NHL season, but portions of the arena's construction had not been completed. Spectator seats were in the process of being installed as fans arrived at the arena for the opening home game on October 21, 1967.

Early years

On October 11, 1967, the North Stars played the first game in franchise history on the road against the St. Louis Blues, another expansion team. The game ended in a 2–2 tie, with former US National Team forward Bill Masterton scoring the first goal in franchise history. On October 21, 1967, the North Stars played their first home game against the California Seals. The North Stars won 3–1. The team achieved success early as it was in first place in the West Division halfway through the 1967–68 season. Tragedy struck the team during the first season on January 13, 1968, when Masterton suffered a fatal hit during a game against the Seals at Met Center. Skating towards the Seals goal across the blue line, Masterton fell backwards, hitting the back of his head on the ice, rendering him unconscious. He never regained consciousness and died on January 15, 1968, at the age of 29, two days after the accident. Doctors described the cause of Masterton's death as a "massive brain injury". To this date, this remains the only death to a player as a result of an injury during a game in NHL history. The North Stars retired his jersey, and later that year, hockey writers established the Bill Masterton Memorial Trophy which would be given annually to a player who best exemplifies the qualities of perseverance, sportsmanship and dedication to hockey. Following the news of Masterton's death, the North Stars lost the next six games.

The North Stars would achieve success in their first year of existence by finishing in fourth place in the West Division with a record of 27–32–15, and advancing to the playoffs. During the 1968 playoffs, the North Stars defeated the Los Angeles Kings in seven games after losing the first two in the series. In the next round, the West finals, the North Stars faced the St. Louis Blues in a series which would also go to a seventh game. Minnesota was one game away from advancing to the Stanley Cup Finals, but in the deciding game, they lost in double overtime.

The team was led in the early years by the goaltending duo Lorne "Gump" Worsley and Cesare Maniago. Defenseman Ted Harris was the North Stars' captain. The first Stars team also included high-scoring winger Bill Goldsworthy and other quality players such as Barry Gibbs, Jude Drouin, J. P. Parise, Danny Grant, Lou Nanne, Tom Reid and Dennis Hextall.

The World Hockey Association (WHA) began play in 1972 with a franchise based in St. Paul, the Minnesota Fighting Saints. While a number of exhibition games were played between teams in the two leagues, the North Stars never played their cross-town rivals. However, the competition for the hockey dollar between these two clubs was fierce. Despite making a good account of themselves on the ice, insurmountable financial difficulties forced the Fighting Saints to fold midway through their fourth season. A second incarnation of the Fighting Saints only lasted half of the following season before folding as well.

By 1978 the North Stars had missed the playoffs in five of the previous six seasons, and had only tallied two winning seasons since joining the league. Attendance had tailed off so rapidly that the league feared that the franchise was on the verge of folding. At this point, Gordon and George Gund III, owners of the equally strapped Cleveland Barons, stepped in with an unprecedented solution—merging the North Stars with the Barons. The merged team retained the North Stars name, colors, and history, and remained in Minnesota. However, the wealthier Gunds became majority owners of the merged team, and the North Stars moved from the then-five team Smythe Division to assume the Barons' place in the Adams Division (which would otherwise have been left with only three teams) for the 1978–79 season. The recently retired Nanne was named general manager, and a number of the Barons players – notably goaltender Gilles Meloche and forwards Al MacAdam and Mike Fidler – bolstered the Minnesota lineup. Furthermore, Minnesota had drafted Bobby Smith, who would go on to win the Calder Memorial Trophy as the NHL's top rookie that year, and Steve Payne, who himself would go on to record 42 goals in his second campaign in 1979–80.

On January 15, 1979, the North Stars defeated the New York Rangers in Madison Square Garden 8–1. Tim Young became the 2nd player in NHL history to score 5 goals on 5 shots - his 5-goal game remains the best offensive output by a player in the Minnesota/Dallas franchise.

1980s
In the middle of this transition, a historic night awaited the North Stars. On January 7, 1980, Minnesota was scheduled to play the Philadelphia Flyers, who came to Bloomington sporting the NHL's and major league sports’ longest undefeated streak, a 35-game run which included 25 wins and 10 ties. An all-time record Met Center crowd of 15,962 squeezed into the arena, which would remain the highest total in all 26 seasons of the North Stars franchise. Minnesota ended the Flyers' streak with a 7–1 win, seven different Stars scoring seven unanswered goals. In the quarter-final round 1980 Stanley Cup playoffs, the North Stars upset the four-time defending champion Montreal Canadiens in seven games before ultimately bowing out to Philadelphia in the following round.

With the addition of new players such as Minnesota native and ex-1980 Olympian Neal Broten and sniper Dino Ciccarelli, the North Stars had five straight winning seasons starting in 1979–80, which included back-to-back trips to the Stanley Cup semifinals, first against the Flyers in 1980 and then against the Calgary Flames in 1981. By defeating the Flames in 1981, the North Stars reached their first Stanley Cup Final, only to lose in five games to the heavily favored New York Islanders.

On November 11, 1981, the Winnipeg Jets visited Met Center. Fueled by an 8-goal second period, and a 4-goal, 7-point night by Bobby Smith, the North Stars scored the most goals in an NHL game since 1944 in a 15–2 win. 

Following the 1981 NHL realignment to a more geographically grouped configuration, the North Stars found themselves placed in the Norris Division. Dino Ciccarelli scored a franchise record 55 goals in just his second season in 1981–82, leading Minnesota to its first division title. The team, however, bowed out of the playoffs in the first round against the Chicago Black Hawks.

In the summer of 1982, general manager Lou Nanne orchestrated one of the franchise's biggest moves ever, landing a star in the making by drafting highly coveted Brian Bellows. It paid immediate dividends, as Bellows would score 35 goals in his rookie season of 1982–83 and help the team to finish with 40 wins and 96 regular season points – both the most ever recorded in the 26 years the franchise was based in Minnesota. Once again, though, the North Stars fell in the playoffs to the Black Hawks, this time in the second round.

Beginning in 1983–84, the team was determined to erase the failures of the previous two campaigns and came close to doing so. This was a season of change for the North Stars and their fans, as Bill Mahoney, a defensive-minded teacher of the game, took over as coach. Very early in the season, a major trade shook the organization, all of Minnesota, and the NHL. The popular Bobby Smith was shipped off to the Montreal Canadiens for a pair of defense-minded forwards, Keith Acton and Mark Napier. The team posted the second-highest victory total in its history with 39, and win its second Norris Division crown in three years. Luckily for the North Stars, the Norris Division was very weak that year; they were the only team in the division to have a winning record that season.

In the playoffs, the North Stars finally defeated their rival, the Chicago Black Hawks. Minnesota won the series 3–2, then eliminated the St. Louis Blues in seven games. Only one team remained between the North Stars’ second Stanley Cup Final appearance in four seasons: Wayne Gretzky's Edmonton Oilers. It was a tough, high-scoring series, but Edmonton's star-studded lineup proved too much for the North Stars, and the Oilers swept Minnesota in four games en route to their first Stanley Cup championship.

After 1984, the franchise only had one more winning season in Minnesota, in 1985–86. Seemingly, the franchise hit bottom in 1987–88, when it won only 19 games, still the second-fewest wins in franchise history. However, the Norris Division was so weak that year (only the Detroit Red Wings finished with a winning record) that they and Toronto Maple Leafs were fighting it out for the last playoff spot from the division on the last day of the season despite having the two worst records in the league. In those days, the four top teams in each division made the playoffs, regardless of record. A loss to the Calgary Flames coupled with the Leafs' win over the Red Wings not only kept the North Stars out of the playoffs, but also assured them of the worst record in the league. While the late 1980s saw the franchise draft what would turn out to be their greatest player – forward Mike Modano – chronic attendance problems spurred the owners to threaten to move the club to the San Francisco Bay Area, against the league's wishes.

1990s

The NHL instituted a compromise for the 1990–91 season whereby the Gund brothers were awarded an expansion team in the Bay Area, the San Jose Sharks, that would receive players from Minnesota via a dispersal draft with the North Stars. Both the Sharks and North Stars would then be able to select players from the other twenty NHL teams in an expansion draft. A group previously petitioning for an NHL team in the Bay Area, led by Howard Baldwin and Morris Belzberg, bought the North Stars as part of the deal. Baldwin and Belzberg purchased the team from the Gund brothers for approximately $38.1 million (including $1 million in liabilities as well as giving the Gunds their share of the fees from the next three expansion teams, expected to be $7.14 million). Norman Green, a former part-owner of the Calgary Flames and a last-minute newcomer to Baldwin and Belzberg's group, purchased 51% controlling interest in the North Stars from them, with Baldwin and Belzberg sharing the remaining 49% stake in the team. Green agreed to purchase Baldwin's 24.5% share, giving him more than 75% control of the team shortly after a dispute with Baldwin arose. Belzberg maintained his share of the rest of the team's stock until October 1990, when Green became the team's sole owner by buying Belzberg's shares.

In the 1990–91 season, despite a losing record in the regular season, the North Stars embarked on a Cinderella run to the Stanley Cup Finals. They knocked off the Chicago Blackhawks and St. Louis Blues (the top two teams in the NHL during the regular season) in six games each and the defending Stanley Cup Champion Edmonton Oilers in five games, making it to the finals for the second time in franchise history. The team fought hard against the eventual champion Pittsburgh Penguins, led by Mario Lemieux. They won two out of the first three contests before being obliterated 8–0 in Game 6 of the best-of-seven series. It was the most one-sided defeat in a deciding game of the Stanley Cup Finals since the original Ottawa Senators defeated the Dawson City Nuggets 23–2 in 1905.

Following the 1991 Finals run, the North Stars adopted a new logo – the word "STARS" in italicized gold capitals over a green star with a gold outline; the gold now a more metallic shade than the previous yellowish shade. The team also adopted black as their primary color for their road uniforms, and eliminated gold from the uniform, except for the logo. Even before the logo change, it had been speculated that the North Stars would adopt a new logo following the 1990–91 season, as the future primary logo was first painted on the Met Center ice prior to the aforementioned season, albeit in a reverse color scheme than its upcoming incarnation.

To celebrate the team's 25th anniversary, the team wore a commemorative patch on the left shoulder of their uniforms. The patch depicted Bill Goldsworthy, wearing a green uniform, facing off against Mike Modano, wearing the new black uniform.

The North Stars were allowed to protect fourteen players from selection by to the Sharks as per the 1991 expansion agreement. This meant the core of their 1991 conference championship roster essentially remained intact, with the North Stars only losing four players from their NHL roster to San Jose (the Sharks' remaining selections from Minnesota were minor leaguers). As a result, while the Sharks endured the typical struggles of an expansion team and finished last overall, the North Stars actually modestly improved from the 1990–91 regular season although they nevertheless finished with another losing record. They still made the 1992 playoffs with their new look, and took a 3–2 series lead into Game 6 at the Met Center against the Norris Division champion Detroit Red Wings. The Red Wings won, 1–0, in overtime after a video referee review confirmed that Sergei Fedorov had scored a goal. This was the first use of video replay in the Stanley Cup playoffs. The Wings won the seventh game at home, 5–2.

Departure to Dallas

By 1992, Norm Green was arranging a deal to turn the team into the Los Angeles Stars, playing at a new arena (which is now the Honda Center) under construction in Anaheim, California. However, as The Walt Disney Company was already in negotiations with the NHL to create an expansion team in the area, the league instead asked Green to let Disney create the Mighty Ducks of Anaheim while the North Stars would be allowed to relocate to any city of Green's choosing. In January 1993, Green chose Dallas, Texas as the new home of the franchise, and the decision was formally announced on March 10. Several reasons were cited for the relocation, including poor attendance during a string of losing seasons, the failure to reach deals for a new arena in either Minneapolis or Saint Paul, and a sexual harassment lawsuit against Green that resulted in his wife threatening to leave him unless he moved the team. The subsequent decision to relocate the franchise to Texas made Green much reviled in Minnesota, where he derisively came to be known as "Norm Greed".

Another factor that also precipitated the move to Dallas was the fact that the team refused to play at the Target Center, where the NBA's Minnesota Timberwolves played, due to the fact that Coca-Cola had advertising and pouring rights at that arena. The North Stars and the Met Center had Pepsi as their sponsor. Despite that, the newly relocated Stars did play at Target Center on December 9, 1993, against the Ottawa Senators, though only 14,058 fans showed up to watch the Stars defeat the Senators 6–1.

Due to mounting financial problems resulting from poor management of his non-hockey business ventures, Green only kept the Stars for three more years before selling them to Tom Hicks in 1996.

On the other hand, the Dallas franchise has taken some steps to mend the emotional wounds left in Minnesota. When the Dallas Stars won the 1999 Stanley Cup–three years after Green sold the team–their official video "Nothing Else Matters" not only included their past seasons' disappointments, but also paid tribute to the North Stars' 1991 run to the final, of which star Mike Modano and general manager Bob Gainey had been part.

Modano, who retired in 2011, was the last former North Star in the NHL, leaving the Stars franchise after the  season. The last active former North Star was Mike Craig, who played in Italy until 2013. After Modano's last game as a Dallas Star, which was in Minnesota playing the Wild, Modano came on the ice as the first star wearing a North Stars jersey, getting a standing ovation from the crowd.

With the departure of former North Stars scout Les Jackson from the Dallas Stars franchise on June 30, 2020, there is no longer anyone working for Dallas who had a direct connection to the franchise's time in Minnesota.

Return of NHL hockey to Minnesota

NHL hockey returned to Minnesota when the NHL announced in 1997 that the state had been awarded an expansion franchise to begin play in the 2000–01 NHL season. In 1998, the team name for the new franchise became the Minnesota Wild.

On December 17, 2000, the Wild hosted the Dallas Stars in the latter's first visit to Minnesota since the relocation (excluding the aforementioned neutral-site game at Target Center in 1993). The Wild won that game 6–0 with Darby Hendrickson scoring two goals and Manny Fernandez making 24 saves for a shutout. As of the 2020–21 season, the Stars won 45 of 79 meetings with the Wild, with one tie and six OT/SO losses. The two teams also faced each other in the 2016 first round of the Stanley Cup playoffs, with the Stars prevailing in six games.

On April 4, 2017, the Wild honored the North Stars by wearing North Stars jerseys for warmups, despite the North Stars history belonging to the Dallas Stars. Martin Hanzal warmed up with number 91, as the North Stars retired number 19 in honor of Bill Masterton. Zach Parise also warmed up with equipment belonging to his father, the late Jean-Paul Parise, who played for the North Stars.

An alumni game pitting the Chicago Blackhawks against Team Minnesota took place the day prior to the 2016 NHL Stadium Series. Team Minnesota featured a mix of former North Stars and Wild players, and wore throwback North Stars jerseys with the former's logo on the right shoulder and the Wild logo on the left shoulder.

For the 2020–21 season, the Minnesota Wild introduced a version of the 1978 North Stars jersey, featuring a recolored Wild logo as part of the league-wide "Reverse Retro" jersey program. In the 2022–23 season, a green version of the "Reverse Retro" jersey was used.

Seasons and records

Season-by-season record

The team had 17 playoff appearances, a 77–82 playoff record, 2 Norris Division championships, and 2 Campbell Conference championships.

Note: GP = Games played, W = Wins, L = Losses, T = Ties, Pts = Points, GF = Goals for, GA = Goals against, PIM = Penalties in minutes

Team leaders
Regular season
 Games played: Neal Broten, 876
 Goals: Brian Bellows, 342
 Assists: Neal Broten, 547
 Points: Neal Broten, 796
 Penalty minutes: Basil McRae, 1,567
 Games: Cesare Maniago, 420
 Wins: Cesare Maniago, 145
 Shutouts: Cesare Maniago, 26

Single season
 Goals: Dino Ciccarelli (1981–82) and Brian Bellows (1989-90), 55
 Assists: Neal Broten, 76 (1985–86)
 Points: Bobby Smith, 114  (1981–82)
 Penalty minutes: Basil McRae, 382 (1987–88)
 Wins: Jon Casey, 31 (1989–90)
 Shutouts: Cesare Maniago, 6 (1967–68)

Playoffs
 Games played: Neal Broten, 104
 Goals: Steve Payne, 35
 Assists: Bobby Smith, 50
 Points: Brian Bellows, 83
 Penalty minutes: Willi Plett, 201
 Games: Gilles Meloche, 45
 Wins: Gilles Meloche and Jon Casey, 21
 Shutouts: Cesare Maniago, 3

Team scoring leaders
This is a listing of the top ten point scorers in franchise history.

Note: Pos = Position; GP = Games played; G = Goals; A = Assists; Pts = Points; P/G = Points per game

NHL awards and trophies
Clarence S. Campbell Bowl
1990–91

Calder Memorial Trophy
Danny Grant: 1968–69
Bobby Smith: 1978–79

Bill Masterton Memorial Trophy
Al MacAdam: 1979–80

Leaders

 Team captains Note: This list does not include Dallas Stars, California Golden Seals and Cleveland Barons captains''.
 Bob Woytowich 1967–68
 Elmer Vasko 1968–69
 Claude Larose 1969–70
 Ted Harris 1970–74
 Bill Goldsworthy 1974–76
 Bill Hogaboam 1976–77
 Nick Beverley 1977–78 J. P. Parise 1978–79
 Paul Shmyr 1979–81
 Tim Young 1981–82
 Craig Hartsburg 1982–89
 Brian Bellows 1984 (interim)
 Curt Giles 1989–91
 Mark Tinordi 1991–93

Head coaches
Wren Blair, 1967–70
John Muckler, 1968–69
Charlie Burns, 1969–70, 1974–75
Jack Gordon, 1970–75
Parker MacDonald, 1973–74
Ted Harris, 1975–78
Andre Beaulieu, 1977–78
Lou Nanne, 1977–78Harry Howell, 1978–79
Glen Sonmor, 1978–87
Murray Oliver, 1982–83
Bill Mahoney, 1983–85
Lorne Henning, 1985–87
Herb Brooks, 1987–88
Pierre Page, 1988–90
Bob Gainey, 1990–93

Notable players

Hockey Hall of Fame

Retired numbers

These numbers remain retired with the Dallas Stars today. In addition to Goldsworthy and Masterton, the Stars have retired the number 7 of Neal Broten, who played with the North Stars from 1981 to 1993, and the number 9 of Mike Modano who played from 1988 to 1993.

First round draft picks
 1967: Wayne Cheesman (fourth overall)
 1968: Jim Benzelock (fifth overall)
 1969: Dick Redmond (fifth overall)
 1970: none
 1971: none
 1972: Jerry Byers (12th overall)
 1973: none
 1974: Doug Hicks (sixth overall)
 1975: Bryan Maxwell (fourth overall)
 1976: Glen Sharpley (third overall)
 1977: Brad Maxwell (seventh overall)
 1978: Bobby Smith (first overall)
 1979: Craig Hartsburg (sixth overall) and Tom McCarthy (10th overall)
 1980: Brad Palmer (16th overall)
 1981: Ron Meighan (13th overall)
 1982: Brian Bellows (second overall)
 1983: Brian Lawton (first overall)
 1984: David Quinn (13th overall)
 1985: none
 1986: Warren Babe (12th overall)
 1987: Dave Archibald (sixth overall)
 1988: Mike Modano (first overall)
 1989: Doug Zmolek (seventh overall)
 1990: Derian Hatcher (eighth overall)
 1991: Richard Matvichuk (eighth overall)
 1992: none

Logos and colors

The North Stars were known for their "classic" green and gold color scheme. For the majority of their existence, the North Stars wore white jerseys with green and gold striping at home and green jerseys with white and gold stripes on the road. Black trim was added to the white jerseys in 1981, and to the green jerseys in 1988. In 1988–89, the pants changed from green to black, with three stars on each side in place of stripes.

In 1991, black became the primary color, as the team underwent a complete redesign. The new logo and uniforms were carried over to Dallas after the team moved south.

Broadcasting
WTCN-TV Channel 11 (now KARE) carried North Stars games from 1967 to 1979. Usually, 27 road games and three home games were televised each season. Frank Buetel was the play-by-play announcer from 1967 to 1970. Hal Kelly took over for the next few years. followed by Joe Boyle in the mid-1970s. Boyle was joined by color commentator Roger Buxton. After the station gained NBC affiliation in 1979, telecasts moved to KMSP-TV (now a Fox owned-and-operated station), with most called by Bob Kurtz and retired North Stars defenseman Tom Reid (incidentally, Kurtz and Reid are the Minnesota Wild's current radio announce team). KITN (now WFTC) televised North Stars games with Frank Mazzocco on play-by-play with color commentators Fred Barrett and Wally Shaver from the 1984–85 through 1986–87 seasons. The 1987–88 season saw North Stars' games telecast over Saint Cloud-based UHF station KXLI (with Kurtz on play-by-play and former Islander goalie Glenn "Chico" Resch on color). After Kurtz moved on to Massachusetts-based NESN in the summer of 1988, Doug McLeod joined Resch in the broadcast booth beginning with the 1988–89 season. The North Stars' telecasts returned to KMSP in December 1988. The majority of the road games continued to be shown on KMSP, though late in the season some road games were shown on the premium channel Midwest Sports Channel. For the 1989–90 season, Tom Reid joined McLeod in the booth, replacing Resch as color commentator. The 1990–91 season saw first Lou Nanne, then Dave Maloney, and then again, for the playoffs, Nanne paired with McLeod for television broadcasts on both of these same channels. Telecasts were almost exclusively of North Stars' road games, although a handful of home games were televised during that period of time. The 1991 Stanley Cup Finals run saw home games available only on pay-per-view and not available to most hockey fans in Minnesota. Dave Hodge handled TV play-by-play, partnering with color analyst Joe Micheletti in the 1991–92 season.

North Stars radio broadcasts originated from WCCO Radio from 1967 to 1978, then moved to another Twin Cities-based clear-channel station, KSTP, where radio broadcasts stayed until the team moved to Dallas in 1993, save a few seasons on a 5,000-watt radio station, WAYL. Al Shaver was the play-by-play radio announcer throughout the Stars' stay in Minnesota. During the WCCO era, Shaver was joined for many home games by WCCO's Larry Jagoe in the early seasons, followed by WCCO personality Steve Cannon. Shaver's partners on KSTP were Russ Small, Ted Robinson, and (during the last three seasons) former Dallas Stars announcer Ralph Strangis. During the Stars' final season (1992–93), Shaver and Strangis called games on KMSP, while the Stars' cable TV game announcer, Doug McLeod, called games over KSTP and the Stars' radio network.

Shaver is a ten-time Minnesota Sportscaster of the Year and, as the 1993 Foster Hewitt Memorial Award-winner, a member of the Hockey Hall of Fame. Following the team's departure to Dallas, he called University of Minnesota Golden Gophers hockey games until his retirement in 1996.

It was on the night of the Stars' final game at Joe Louis Arena versus the Detroit Red Wings that Shaver first shared the broadcast booth with his son, Wally, who is the current Gopher hockey radio announcer. The elder Shaver's call of the closing moments of the last-ever North Stars game went thus:

Radio

Al Shaver did all radio play-by-play except in 1992–93, when he did radio play-by-play on non televised games. He also missed some games when he did the high school hockey tournament in a number of years. Shaver's replacements were Bob Kurtz (1979–80), Ted Robinson (1980–81 and 1981–82), Frank Mazzocco (1986–87), Ralph Strangis (1990–91). In 1992–93, Doug McLeod did radio play-by-play on televised games with various analysts including Doug Woog, Tom Vannelli, and Wally Shaver.

Shaver did not follow the North Stars when they moved to Dallas in 1993, opting to stay in the Twin Cities. He called University of Minnesota men's hockey for several seasons, then retired in 1996. Shaver came out of retirement for one season in 2000, when the NHL returned to Minnesota with the debut of the Minnesota Wild, calling their games during their inaugural season in 2000–01.

After retiring as a player, Reid spent 12 years as color commentator for the North Stars. After the team's move to Dallas, Reid continued as an analyst for NCAA hockey. He and Bob Kurtz have been part of the radio broadcast team for the Minnesota Wild since the team's inaugural season in 2000.

Although Strangis had a great deal of broadcast experience, his tryout as color commentator on the Minnesota North Stars radio network was a longshot; other better-known sportscasters received more air time during the auditioning process. The five potential candidates split up a game as guest commentators alongside Al Shaver, then voice of the Minnesota North Stars. The two better-known talents each took a period and then the three longshots split up the third, with Strangis going last. When Al Shaver was asked who he liked the best, he chose Strangis. Ralph shone in his audition, with the perfect ability to complement Shaver's play-by-play with insights from the players and his own intimate knowledge of the game. When the Stars moved to Dallas in 1993, Shaver decided to not to migrate south with the franchise and retired. After three more seasons as color commentator (teaming with Mike Fornes), Strangis migrated to the play-by-play mic, effectively cementing his status as the "Voice of the Stars."

Television

In 1979, Kurtz joined KMSP-TV, where he called Minnesota Twins games from 1979 to 1986 and Minnesota North Stars games from 1979 to 1984. He was also the North Stars play by play announcer on KXLI-TV during the 1987–88 NHL season. From 1988 to 1989, he was the sports director at KSTP radio, where he also called University of Minnesota hockey, football and basketball. Kurtz returned to Minnesota in 2000 when he was hired to become the first radio play by play announcer for the Minnesota Wild. He was reunited with Tom Reid, who he previously worked with while calling games for the North Stars as well as University of Minnesota and Michigan State hockey broadcasts.

See also
 List of Minnesota North Stars players
 List of Minnesota North Stars draft picks
 Dallas Stars
 Minnesota Wild
 California Seals
 Cleveland Barons
 List of defunct NHL teams
 1967 NHL expansion

References

Bibliography

External links

 
Defunct ice hockey teams in Minnesota
Defunct National Hockey League teams
National Hockey League in Minneapolis–Saint Paul
Ice hockey clubs established in 1967
Sports clubs disestablished in 1993
Sports in Minneapolis–Saint Paul
Ice hockey in Minnesota
1967 establishments in Minnesota
1993 disestablishments in Minnesota